Lee Si-eon (born Lee Bo-yeon on July 3, 1982) is a South Korean actor. He is best known for his comic supporting role in the popular campus drama Reply 1997. He is also known for being a cast member of MBC's popular reality TV show I Live Alone until his departure in December 2020.

Personal life 
Lee has been in a relationship with actress Seo Ji-seung since 2017. 

On November 8, 2021, it was reported that Lee would be getting married in a private ceremony on December 25, 2021, in Jeju. Later that same day, Lee's agency confirmed the report.

Filmography

Film

Television series

Television show

Music video

Theater

Awards and nominations

References

External links

 
 

1982 births
Living people
People from Busan
South Korean male film actors
South Korean male television actors
South Korean television personalities
South Korean male web series actors
Seoul Institute of the Arts alumni